Meguro, Tokyo, held a local election for the city assembly on April 15, 2007.

Results 

|-
! style="background-color:#E9E9E9;text-align:left;" |Parties
! style="background-color:#E9E9E9;text-align:right;" |Votes
! style="background-color:#E9E9E9;text-align:right;" |%
! style="background-color:#E9E9E9;text-align:right;" |Seats
|-
| style="text-align:left;" |Liberal Democratic Party of Japan (自由民主党, Jiyū Minshutō)
| style="text-align:right;" | 23,910.873
| style="text-align:right;" | 
| style="text-align:right;" | 15
|-
| style="text-align:left;" |Democratic Party of Japan (民主党, Minshutō)
| style="text-align:right;" | 11,995,438
| style="text-align:right;" | 
| style="text-align:right;" | 7
|-
| style="text-align:left;" |Japanese Communist Party (日本共産党, Nihon Kyōsan-tō)
| style="text-align:right;" | 8,597
| style="text-align:right;" | 
| style="text-align:right;" | 5
|-
| style="text-align:left;" |New Komeito party (公明党, Kōmeitō)
| style="text-align:right;" | 9,671.649
| style="text-align:right;" | 
| style="text-align:right;" | 3
|-
| style="text-align:left;" |目黒･生活者ネットワーク
| style="text-align:right;" | 1,695
| style="text-align:right;" | 
| style="text-align:right;" | 1
|-
| style="text-align:left;" |Social Democratic Party (社民党 Shamin-tō)
| style="text-align:right;" | 1,525.476
| style="text-align:right;" | 
| style="text-align:right;" | 1
|-
| style="text-align:left;" | Independents
| style="text-align:right;" | 10,876
| style="text-align:right;" | 
| style="text-align:right;" | 4
|-
|style="text-align:left;background-color:#E9E9E9"|Total (turnout 38.49%)
|width="75" style="text-align:right;background-color:#E9E9E9"| 81,168
|width="30" style="text-align:right;background-color:#E9E9E9"| 100.00
|width="30" style="text-align:right;background-color:#E9E9E9"| 36
|-
| style="text-align:left;" colspan=4 |Source:JanJan
|}
Local elections in Japan
Meguro
2007 elections in Japan
April 2007 events in Japan
2007 in Tokyo